George Coandă (born 12 October 1937 in Şimian, Bihor, Romania), is a historian, novelist, poet and literary critic, historian of culture and Romanian journalist. George Coandă is the founder of the Valahia University of Târgoviște.

Works
 1974 Univers liber; Free Universe
 1980 Secunda în plus; Second more
 1985 Spaţii de suflet; Spaces soul
 1989 Eternele columne; Eternal columns
 1996 O cetate, o patrie; A city, a country
 1997 O mie nouăsute nouăzeci şi şapte după Hristos;
 1998 Cabinetul cu stampe;
 2000 Clipa şi istoria. Târgovişte;
 2002 Spaţiu istoric românesc. Imagini geopolitice şi de geocivilizaţie;
 2002 Geocivilizaţie românească; Romanian geocivilization
 2002 Valahia. Istoria unei universităţi;
 2003 Carpaţii - spaţiu de conservare şi continuitate a vetrei etnice româneşti;
 2003 Oarecum
 2004 Arheologia viitorului. Cei ce ne privesc din stele Târgovişte;
 2005 Cosmopoetica Târgovişte;
 2005 Istoria Târgoviştei. Cronologie enciclopedică;
 2006 Mic tratat de politologie reflexivă;
 2006 Ambasador la Ecuator sau Drumul unei vieţi de la marxism la gândirea liberă. Nicolae Tăbârcă în dialog cu George Coandă;
 2006 Destinul românilor pe Golgota istorie Târgovişte;
 2006 O istorie geopolitică şi a geocivilizaţiei românilor.

References

External links
  GEORGE COANDĂ

1937 births
Romanian poets
Romanian male poets
20th-century Romanian historians
Members of the Romanian Orthodox Church
Living people
21st-century Romanian historians